The Latrun salient is an area of the West Bank that protrudes into Israeli territory. It is surrounded by a strip of territory covering , that has the formal status of a no man's land (NML) between Israel and Palestine. Israel considers the NML a part of its state, while Palestinians regard it as part of the West Bank.

Background
The region consists of hills and an arable plain that historically was owned and cultivated for centuries by Palestinian fellahin. It forms a crucial junction between Jaffa and Jerusalem. Its importance as a strategic transit area was recognized by the military authorities of Mandatory Palestine who built a formidable Tegart fortress on a hilltop site there. The United Nations Partition Plan for Palestine assigned the region to a future Arab state. Throughout the ensuing 1948 Arab–Israeli War, Jordan's Arab Legion managed to maintain control of the terrain overlooked by the Tegart fort and the Trappist Latrun monastery despite fierce attempts by Israel forces to gain possession. In the immediate aftermath of the war, as a result of the Armistice agreement drawn up the following year, the area was demarcated by two lines reflecting the respective positions of the two armies at the time of the ceasefire, with the land between the lines defined as no man's land, controlled by neither party,. The lands of the village of Dayr Ayyub, conquered and depopulated by Israel in 1948 also fell within this area.

1949–1967
Over the following nineteen year period, both sides endeavoured to wrest control by extending their respective agricultural activities in parts of the contested zone, while recognising the autonomy of the monastery, which lay under the protection and patronage of France. Both parties agreed in an extraparliamentary accord, operative from 7 June 1951, to allow an exception for the Trappist monks, whose land holding extends over 1,000 dunams and who were permitted to harvest their vineyards in no man's land. During this period, Israeli kibbutzim adjacent to the Green Line managed to put some 600 hectares (1500 acres) under cultivation, while Palestinian farmers extended their use over 50 hectares (125 acres), with both sides planting these areas with yearly cereal crops while refraining from planting orchards or olive groves, or building any structures. Talks to expand Israel's borders when Levi Eshkol assumed the Prime Ministership in 1963 led to a variety of plans, one of which, code-named Mozart, envisaged "grabs" of territory like Latrun. Occasionally these encroachments led to open conflict as with the two-day "Tractors war" in October 1965, which led to a formal complaint on 1 November by Jordan before the United Nations. The Jordanians submitted that on 30 October an incursion took place within the no man's land zone consisting of a sortie of 24 tractors under full IDF military escort. Alerted the UN observers requested a complete withdrawal, which only met an Israeli response of sending further reinforcements. Israel, the following day, stated to the UN that both sides had indulged in movements of this kind, and that the problem was to be resolved through the usual Armistice regulatory machinery.

1967–present
The order to seize the Latrun area came from Moshe Dayan late in the evening of day one of the Six-Day War. IDF military units began their operation at midnight and had secured their aims by 4 a.m. There was no Jordanian opposition, since the Jordanian garrison, aware it was undermanned in Latrun, had shifted troops stationed there to Jerusalem, regarding the defense of that city as their priority. Three Palestinian villages of Bayt Nuba, Imwas/Emmaus and Yalo bordering on the no man's land were razed and 12,000 inhabitants of the area expelled eastwards, while the cultivable land was handed over to nearby kibbutzim. On Israeli maps since then, both the Armistice line and the no man's land enclave have disappeared.  The area was declared a closed military zone, with substantial parts transformed into the national Canada Park. The Separation Barrier built eastwards now foldsthe entire Latrun enclave within the Israeli side of the fence. The settlement of Mevo Horon, established in 1970, is now said to mark the separation of the Latrun enclave from the rest of the West Bank. Four other settlements were established in the NML, Kfar Ruth, Lapid, Maccabim and Shilat (which is also partially in Israel). The Israeli-Palestinian village of Neve Shalom, founded on a project of creating a model for Israeli-Palestinian communities, was also established in the NML, cultivating land partially leased from the Catholic authorities. Israeli municipal jurisdiction was extended over these five settlements. By 2010 1,200 Israeli settlers had established homes in the area. The Tel Aviv–Jerusalem railway runs underneath the area.

Peace negotiations
In 1949 Abdallah offered Israel the Jewish quarter of Jerusalem and withdrawal from the strategic Latrun area in return for the Israeli-held Qatamon quarter of Jerusalem and the repatriation of Lydda and Ramie refugees. According to Raja Shehadeh, Israeli effectively annexed the area of no man's land in 1967. No such formal act of annexation exists however. In peace negotiations, according to Gideon Biger, the Israeli position has been that they retain as sovereign property half of the NLM, while the other half, while belonging to Palestinians, should remain part of Israel, and the Palestinians compensated for its loss by accepting an area of similar dimensions elsewhere. A variant of Abdallah 1's land-trade offer resurfaced in 1978 as peace talks between Israel and Egypt were underway. Jordan expressed a willingness to renounce their claims on the Latrun area in exchange for the Israeli spur that once truncated the main Bethlehem-Jerusalem road. Israel has proposed annexing some 38.2 km² (15 sq. mi.) of the area. The Palestinian viewpoint rebuffs this as constituting a gratuitous appropriation of a substantial amount of uninhabited Palestinian land, with no settlers or settlements, and asserts the primacy of re-establishing the three villages that were removed and whose population was expelled.

Legal status
The strips of territory known as no man's land in the Latrun and Jerusalem regions were among the territories occupied by Israel following the 1967 war. Both the United Nations and the European Union consider Israeli localities in the Latrun no man's land to be illegal settlements.

Notes

Citations

Sources

Arab villages depopulated after the 1948 Arab–Israeli War
Disputed territories in Asia
Territorial disputes
West Bank